Zyras collaris is a species of aleocharinae rove beetle in the genus Zyras. The species lives in Europe.

References

Aleocharinae
Beetles of Europe